Stephen Crichton (born 22 September 2000) is a Samoan professional rugby league footballer who plays as a  for the Penrith Panthers in the NRL and Samoa at international level.

He won both the 2021 and the 2022 NRL Grand Finals with the Panthers. He has represented the NSW Blues in State of Origin.

Background
Crichton was born in Apia, Samoa. He moved to New Zealand at the age of two, before his family eventually settled in Australia. He is the younger brother of Penrith Panthers player Christian Crichton.

Early life
Crichton played his junior rugby league with St Clair Comets.

Career

2019
 
Crichton made his first-grade debut for Penrith against the Cronulla-Sutherland Sharks in round 21 of the 2019 NRL season which ended in a 26–20 victory for Penrith at Panthers Stadium.

2020
In round 8 of the 2020 NRL season, Crichton scored two tries as Penrith defeated the Wests Tigers 19–12 at Bankwest Stadium.

Crichton had a breakout year for Penrith in the 2020 NRL season playing 22 games and scoring 17 tries as Penrith won the minor premiership.  Crichton played in the 2020 NRL Grand Final, scoring a try in the second half as Penrith were defeated by Melbourne 26–20. For a successful individual season, Crichton was named Centre of the Year at the 2020 Dally M Awards and rewarded with a spot in the New South Wales State of Origin 27-man squad although he did not play in the three game series.

2021
In round 5 of the 2021 NRL season, Crichton was fined $1350 by the NRL for pulling benched Canberra Raiders player Joseph Tapine into a celebratory throng and goading him.

Chrichton played a total of 26 games for Penrith in the 2021 NRL season including the club's 2021 NRL Grand Final victory over the South Sydney Rabbitohs.  Crichton scored what would be the match winning try off an intercepted Cody Walker pass as Penrith held on to win 14–12.

On 19 October, Crichton was handed a proposed $4000 fine by the NRL and a breach notice which alleges that he acted contrary to the best interests of the game after he was photographed on social media acting in a disrespectful manner toward the Provan-Summons Trophy.  Although Crichton nor any of the Penrith players had broken the trophy, the NRL alleged Crichton and teammate Nathan Cleary showed disrespect towards the individuals depicted in the iconic moment on the trophy.

2022
 
In round 7 of the 2022 NRL season, Crichton scored a hat-trick in Penrith's 36-6 victory over Canberra.
Crichton played a total of 23 games for Penrith throughout the year including the clubs 2022 NRL Grand Final victory over Parramatta.  Crichton scored the opening try in the final which finished 28-12 in Penrith's favour.

In October Crichton was named in the Samoa squad for the 2021 Rugby League World Cup.

In the 2021 Rugby League World Cup semi-final, Crichton scored two tries and kicked the winning drop goal for Samoa as they defeated England 27-26 in golden point extra-time at the Emirates Stadium. He finished the tournament as the top point scorer with 73 points. 
Crichton played for Samoa in their Rugby League World Cup final loss to Australia.

In November he was named in the 2021 RLWC Team of the Tournament.

2023 
On 16 January, Crichton's management informed Penrith that he would be seeking other opportunities for 2024. On 19 January, Fox League reported that Crichton signed with the Canterbury-Bankstown Bulldogs for four years starting in 2024, which was confirmed by the club on January 22.
On 18 February, Crichton played in Penrith's 13-12 upset loss to St Helens RFC in the 2023 World Club Challenge.

Honours
Individual
 Dally M Centre of The Year: 2020

Club
 2020 Minor Premiership Winners
 2020 NRL Grand Final Runner-up
 2021 NRL Grand Final Winners
 2022 Minor Premiership Winners
 2022 NRL Grand Final Winners

International
 2021 Rugby League World Cup Final

References

External links

Penrith Panthers profile
Samoa profile

2000 births
Living people
Penrith Panthers players
Rugby league centres
Samoan rugby league players
Sportspeople from Apia
Rugby league wingers
New South Wales Rugby League State of Origin players